Pickles Reef is a small coral reef located within the Florida Keys National Marine Sanctuary. It lies to the southeast of Key Largo, to the south the Key Largo Existing Management Area and John Pennekamp Coral Reef State Park.  Unlike many reefs within the Sanctuary, this reef is not within a Sanctuary Preservation Area (SPA).

The reef gets its name from the Pickle Barrel wreck.

Another small reef called Snapper Ledge is nearby.

Shipwreck
Various types of debris are scattered across the reef, including a number of barrel-shaped concrete objects. Local legend was that the concrete objects had been barrels of concrete on a ship or barge that had wrecked on the reef during the Civil War, but an analysis performed in 2008 showed that the concrete was a type of Portland cement produced between 1890 and 1923. Archaeologists have found evidence of an iron- or steel-hulled vessel with two masts that wrecked on the reef, but have not identified the ship. It is not clear how much of the debris on the reef is from that wreck.

Gallery

References

External links 
 
 NOAA National Marine Sanctuary Maps, Florida Keys East
 NOAA Map of Bouys at Snapper Ledge and Pickles Reef
 NOAA Navigational Chart 11464

Coral reefs of the Florida Keys
Underwater diving sites in the United States